Sniper Fury is an online single player video game developed and published by Gameloft.

The action of Sniper Fury takes place in the near future. Technological development and geopolitical changes rendered former methods of resolving conflicts obsolete. Countries, corporations, and organizations employ services of highly trained professionals, who can eliminate specific targets with surgical precision.

Gameplay
The game revolves around mechanics common for most sniper games, where the player has to eliminate a great majority of his targets from long distance. To complete a task, the player can use a variety of futuristic gadgets, e.g. a detection device that will tell the location of every nearby human, or stimulants, which will boost reflexes to supernatural levels.

Release
Sniper Fury was released on 2 December 2015 for Android, iOS and Windows Phone. The Steam version was released on 13 June 2017.

Reception 

Sniper Fury received "mixed or average" reviews, according to review aggregator Metacritic.

References

External links 
 Official website

Gameloft games
Sniper video games
Action-adventure games
IOS games
Online games
Multiplayer and single-player video games
Video games developed in France
Windows games
Windows Phone games
Android (operating system) games
2015 video games